Hoogboom Military Camp was a military installation located in Brasschaat, Belgium, located 10 km northeast of neighboring Antwerp. The venue hosted the Olympic trap and 100 metre running deer shooting events for the 1920 Summer Olympics.

References
Sports-reference.com Shooting events overview at the 1920 Summer Olympics.

Venues of the 1920 Summer Olympics
Olympic shooting venues
Defunct sports venues in Belgium
Sports venues in Antwerp Province
Brasschaat